The following is a list of cast members from the television series adaptation of M*A*S*H.  The term cast members includes one-episode guest appearances. The popularity of M*A*S*H is reflected in the fact that "Goodbye, Farewell and Amen", the show's series finale, was the most watched TV series finale ever when it first aired in 1983, and it remains in that position three decades later.

A 

 Patricia Acevedo
 Patrick Adiarte
 Alan Alda
 Robert Alda
 John Anderson
 Allan Arbus
 John Ashton
 Tom Atkins
 René Auberjonois

B 

 G. W. Bailey
 Jack Baker
 Katherine Baumann
 Ned Beatty
 Ed Begley, Jr.
 Michael Bell
 Xander Berkeley
 Jason Bernard
 Leslie Bevis
 Sorrell Booke
 Roger Bowen
 Gail Bowman
 Guy Boyd
 Bart Braverman
 Timothy Brown
 Joshua Bryant
 Gary Burghoff
 Billy Green Bush

C 

 Hamilton Camp
 Beeson Carroll
 Mary Jo Catlett
 Rosalind Chao
 Stuart Charno
 William Christopher
 Blake Clark
 Jordan Clarke
 Andrew Dice Clay
 Odessa Cleveland
 Barry Corbin
 Bud Cort
 James Cromwell
 Brett Cullen
 Michael Currie

D 

 Blythe Danner
 Brian Dennehy
 Ann Doran
 Dennis Dugan
 Andrew Duggan
 Robert Duvall

E 

 Jeff East
 Gail Edwards
 Michael Ensign
 Art Evans
 Gene Evans

F 

 Jamie Farr
 Gwen Farrell
 Judy Farrell
 Mike Farrell
 Martin Ferrero
 Frances Fong
 Dennis Fimple
 Laurence Fishburne
 Ed Flanders
 Bernard Fox
 Charles Frank
 Alan Fudge

G 

 Teri Garr
 Marcia Gelman
 Danny Goldman
 Roy Goldman
 Arlene Golonka
 Robert Gooden
 David Graf
 Ronny Graham
 James Gregory
 Maru Guerrero
 Anthony Gange

H 

 Kevin Hagen
 Albert Hall
 Philip Baker Hall
 Charles Hallahan
 Gregory Harrison
 Mariette Hartley
 Johnny Haymer
 Sandy Helberg
 Mike Henry
 Alex Henteloff
 Richard Herd
 Mark Herrier
 Edward Herrmann
 Hilly Hicks
 Pat Hingle
 Robert J. Hogan
 Tad Horino
 Michael Horton
 Shizuko Hoshi
 Jerry Houser
 Ron Howard

I 

 Alejandro Illescas
 Robert Ito

J 

 Mickey Jones

K 

 Alex Karras
 Linda Kelsey
 Enid Kent
 Kieu Chinh
 Bruce Kirby
 Bruno Kirby
 Clyde Kusatsu

L 

 Art LaFleur
 Perry Lang
 Sheila Lauritsen
 Britt Leach
 Michael Lerner
 George Lindsey
 Richard Lineback
 Paul Linke
 Larry Linville
 Carol Locatell
 Shelley Long

M 

 Patch Mackenzie
 Mako
 Richard Masur
 John Matuszak
 Jeff Maxwell
 Enrique Mederos
 Linda Meiklejohn
 Denny Miller
 Alan Miró
 Harry Morgan
 Pat Morita
 Joe Morton
 Melinda Mullins
 Christopher Murney
 Michael Murphy

N 

 Kellye Nakahara
 Lori Noel

O 

 Soon-Tek Oh
 Michael O'Keefe
 John Orchard
 Cyril O'Reilly

P 

 Joe Pantoliano
 David Packer
 Jo Ann Pflug
 Robert Phalen
 Mary Kay Place
 Nicholas Pryor

Q 
 Eldon Quick

R 

 Logan Ramsey
 John Randolph
 Stafford Repp
 Gerardo Reyero
 Gene Reynolds
 Peter Riegert
 Jack Riley
 John Ritter
 Benjamín Rivera
 Clete Roberts
 Wayne Rogers
 Andy Romano

S 

 Susan Saint James
 Eileen Saki
 John Schuck
 James Sikking
 Tom Skerritt
 Jack Soo
 Timothy Stack
 Warren Stevens
 McLean Stevenson
 Lynne Marie Stewart
 David Ogden Stiers
 Leonard Stone
 Marcia Strassman
 Gail Strickland
 Tom Sullivan
 Hope Summers
 Todd Susman
 Michael Swan
 Patrick Swayze
 Loretta Swit

T 

 Jeffrey Tambor
 Vic Tayback
 Mark L. Taylor
 Meshach Taylor
 Dennis Troy

V 

 Joan Van Ark
 Sal Viscuso
 Herb Voland

W 

 Loudon Wainwright III
 Jessica Walter
 Kelly Ward
 Craig Wasson
 George Wendt
 Mary Wickes
 Larry Wilcox
 Fred Williamson
 Rita Wilson
 Edward Winter
 G. Wood
 George Wyner

Y 

 Burt Young

Z 

 Jerry Zaks
 Susanne Zenor

M*A*S*H cast members who have died
From the TV series:
 
Kellye Nakahara (January 16, 1948 - February 16, 2020; 72)
David Ogden Stiers (October 31, 1942 - March 3, 2018; 75)	
William Christopher (October 20, 1932 - December 31, 2016; 84)	
Wayne Rogers (April 7, 1933 - December 31, 2015; 82)	
Harry Morgan (April 10, 1915 - December 7, 2011; 96)	
Larry Linville (September 29, 1939 - April 10, 2000; 60)	
McLean Stevenson (November 27, 1927 - February 15, 1996; 68)
 	
Notable guest actors:

Soon-Tek Oh (June 29, 1932 - April 4, 2018; 85)
Edward Herrmann (July 21, 1943 - December 31, 2014; 71)	
Marcia Strassman (April 28, 1948 - October 24, 2014; 66)	
Allan Arbus (February 15, 1918 - April 19, 2013; 95)
Alex Karras (July 15, 1935 - October 12, 2012; 77)
Leslie Nielsen (February 11, 1926 - November 28, 2010; 84)	
Pat Stevens (September 16, 1945 - May 26, 2010; 64)	
Patrick Swayze (August 18, 1952 - September 14, 2009; 57)	
Antony Alda (December 9, 1956 - July 3, 2009; 52)	
Pat Hingle (July 19, 1924 - January 3, 2009; 84)	
Robert Symonds (December 1, 1926 - August 23, 2007; 80)	
Bruno Kirby (April 28, 1949 - August 14, 2006; 57)
Mako Iwamatsu (December 10, 1933 - July 21, 2006; 72)	
Pat Morita (June 28, 1932 - November 24, 2005; 73)	
John Ritter (September 17, 1948 - September 11, 2003; 54)
David Graf (April 16, 1950 - April 7, 2001; 50)
Edward Winter (June 3, 1937 - March 8, 2001; 63)	
G. Wood (George) (December 31, 1919 - July 24, 2000; 80)	
Sorrell Booke (January 4, 1930 - February 11, 1994; 64)	
Johnny Haymer (January 19, 1920 - November 18, 1989; 69)	
Robert Alda (February 26, 1914 - May 3, 1986; 72)	
Herb Voland (October 2, 1918 - April 26, 1981; 62)	
Jack Soo (October 28, 1917 - January 11, 1979; 61)

From the 1970 movie:

René Auberjonois (June 1, 1940 - December 8, 2019; 79)
Dale Ishimoto (April 3, 1923 - March 4, 2004; 80)	
G. Wood (George) (December 31, 1919 - July 24, 2000; 80)	
Bobby Troup (October 18, 1918 - February 7, 1999; 80)	
Dick O'Neill (August 29, 1928 - November 17, 1998; 70)	
Tamara Wilcox (March 4, 1940 - January 30, 1998; 57)	
Roger Bowen (May 25, 1932 - February 16, 1996; 63)
David Arkin (December 24, 1941 - January 14, 1991; 49)	
Marvin Miller (July 18, 1913 - February 8, 1985; 71)
Indus Arthur (April 28, 1941 - December 29, 1984; 43)

See also 
 List of M*A*S*H characters
 List of M*A*S*H episodes

Lists of actors by comedy television series